M. andrewsi  may refer to:
 Metridiochoerus andrewsi, an extinct pig species indigenous to the Pliocene and Pleistocene of Africa
 Moeritherium andrewsi, an extinct mammal species that lived during the Eocene epoch

See also
 Andrewsi (disambiguation)